Belceğiz Bay (also called Belcekız Bay) is a small Mediterranean bay of Turkey. It is the end point of a touristic valley called Butterfly Valley.

References

Landforms of Muğla Province
Fethiye District
Gulfs of Turkey
Turkish Riviera
Bays of the Mediterranean